Philip Schuyler (1733–1804) was a Continental Army major general. General Schuyler''' may also refer to:

Cortlandt V. R. Schuyler (1900–1993), U.S. Army four-star general
Walter S. Schuyler (1849–1932), U.S. Army brigadier general